The Lincolnshire Marsh is a belt of reclaimed salt marsh and sand dune in Lincolnshire, England and between the Lincolnshire Wolds and the North Sea coast. It is up to seven kilometres wide.  It is part of one of the national character areas defined by Natural England.

Geology
During the Ipswichian interglacial the sea level was higher than the present one so that the seaward edge of the Lincolnshire Wolds was eroded. The hills still drop abruptly to the coastal lowland as a result. During the Devensian glacial the ice sheet flowed up to this steep slope and the ice deposited glacial debris. During the Flandrian, since the ice melted, the sea has risen and deposited marine silt and clay over the seaward part of this glacial till. The villages lie on these zones, one band at the foot of the Wolds, one band at the seaward edge of the glacial deposits and a third, less regularly arranged in parts of the marsh which have been artificially enclosed from time to time, to keep the sea out.

References

External links
Marsh restoration project
sea level research
Between them, these sites give some idea of the character of the place.
  Marsh development
 Ingoldmells
 Saltfleetby
 A parish magazine
  South Somercotes bells
 1953 flood
 Humber Wetlands (Vale of York)
 Booklist

Landforms of Lincolnshire
Marshes of England